Eucirroedia is a genus of moths of the family Noctuidae.

Species

 Eucirroedia pampina (Guenée, 1852)

References
Natural History Museum Lepidoptera genus database
Eucirroedia at funet

Cuculliinae